Shoal Lake 28A is an Indian reserve of the Shoal Lake Cree Nation in Saskatchewan. It is 92 kilometres east of Nipawin. In the 2016 Canadian Census, it recorded a population of 424 living in 115 of its 118 total private dwellings. In the same year, its Community Well-Being index was calculated at 46 of 100, compared to 58.4 for the average First Nations community and 77.5 for the average non-Indigenous community.

References

Indian reserves in Saskatchewan
Division No. 14, Saskatchewan